Rampur Bhawanipur is a census town in Barabanki district in the Indian state of Uttar Pradesh.

Demographics
 India census, Rampur Bhawanipur had a population of 11,303. Males constitute 52% of the population and females 48%. Rampur Bhawanipur has an average literacy rate of 36%, lower than the national average of 59.5%: male literacy is 43%, and female literacy is 28%. In Rampur Bhawanipur, 19% of the population is under 6 years of age.

References

Cities and towns in Barabanki district